Skyrora Ltd is a private space company based in the United Kingdom since 2017.

The company specialises in the design and manufacture of modular disassemblable rocket launch vehicles, specifically for the launch of small satellites, and portable launch systems, using eco-friendly technologies such as the fuel known as Ecosene and the Skyrora Space Tug.

Skyrora is headquartered in Edinburgh, while its design and manufacturing facility is in Cumbernauld.

The Skyrora CEO and founder is Volodymyr Levykin, previously the COO of an AIM-listed online dating company Cupid plc.

British astronaut Tim Peake is a board member at Skyrora together with Nick Laird, and Baroness Susan Greenfield.

Overview
In May 2020, Skyrora held a successful static fire test of the Skylark L vehicle at a mobile launch site on Kildermorie Estate in Ross-shire.

In August 2018, Skyrora successfully conducted Scotland's first commercial rocket launch by a private company at Kildermorie Estate in Ross-shire. The company launched the 1.3-metre-tall Skylark Nano rocket using an M class model rocketry motor in August 2018 and the 2-metre-tall Skylark Nano II rocket using a Cesaroni M-1520BS model rocketry motor in July 2019. The rockets are all built and assembled in the United Kingdom.

In  April 2021, Skyrora received €3 million of co-funding from the European Space Agency (ESA).

Rockets

Skylark Nano
The Skylark Nano was launched in 2020 as an unguided supersonic rocket designed for simulating a launch to then be recovered with the use of parachutes. Neither a control system nor a thrust vector control system is required.

It has been launched three times as part of Skyrora's de-risking programme in the Scottish Highlands. Following launches in 2018 and 2019, the rocket has reached an altitude of 6 km during the most recent test in Shetland.

Skylark Micro
The Skylark Micro is a two-stage supersonic rocket designed as an intermediate step between Skylark Nano and Skylark L. It made the flight in August 2020, reaching an altitude of 27 km.

Skylark L

The Skylark L suborbital launch vehicle is the first Skyrora rocket to use a 3D printed hydrogen peroxide–kerosene engine.

It is capable of fulfilling scientific micro-gravity needs.

Skylark L was developed to launch 60 kg of payload 100 km up.

This rocket was subject to a full static fire test in May 2020 at the Kildermorie Estate in Alness, Scotland, which was the first ground rocket test in Scotland in 50 years.

On 8 October 2022 the Skylark L rocket attempted a suborbital test flight mission from Langanes (Iceland) launch site. The vehicle experienced an anomaly shortly after lift-off, landing in the sea 500 m from the pad.

Skyrora XL
The Skyrora XL is a three-stage orbital launch vehicle under development with nine hydrogen peroxide–kerosene engines of the same type used in Skylark L. The first flight will take place no earlier than 2023. It is expected that the rocket will be able to bring a payload of 315 kg to a 500 km orbit.

Skyrora has successfully tested a final stage rocket engine in its first stationary ground-firings. In April 2021, the company successfully tested the upper stage of the Skyrora XL rocket and completed a static fire test in its engine development complex in Fife. Hot-fire tests of the first stage are scheduled to take place in mid-2023.

In October 2021 the company made a multi-launch agreement with SaxaVord Spaceport to launch the Skyrora XL from that location. Skyrora also has an agreement with the canadian launch provider Maritime Launch Services to launch Skyrora XL from Spaceport Nova Scotia.

Engines
The company has successfully tested several types of engines in 2020 and 2021:

 Skylark L Engine, a  three-tonne regeneratively cooled bi-liquid rocket engine with a pressure fed system capable of generating 30 kN thrust.
 Skyforce-2, a seven-tonne engine for the first and second stage of the orbital Skyrora XL launch vehicle that uses what Skyrora refers to as "advanced turbopump techniques". It is capable of creating 70 kN thrust.
 LEO engine for Skyrora XL running on hydrogen peroxide and kerosene and producing 3.5 kN thrust, but it has also passed the successful test with Ecosene fuel. The engine is able to re-ignite several times.
 Space Tug, a vehicle that can navigate to any location in open space using its own power and perform multiple manoeuvres in space, which would be useful to remove space debris and maintain or replace satellites in orbit. The upper stage/tug engine was successfully tested in December 2020 and included three static firings of the engine and involved a full flight-ready test involving software and avionics employed in an actual launch. The test was performed at its test site in Fife.

Achievements
In August 2018, Skyrora conducted Scotland's first commercial rocket launch by a private company at Kildermorie Estate in Ross-shire.

In 2020, the company got the status of the Company of a Year in Aerospace & Defense among mid-size companies by Stevie Awards, Inc. after participating in Space Camp accelerator programmes from Seraphim Capital.

In 2019, Skyrora was awarded the CleanTech award at the Go:Tech Awards 2019. In 2020, Skyrora received the Leif Erikson Lunar Prize Award for its innovative project ‘Ecosene’.

In 2020, during the Aviation & Aerospace Awards 2020, Skyrora won the ‘Best Small Satellite Launch Vehicle Manufacturer Award’.

In 2021, Skyrora received £2.5 million in funding from European Space Agency as a part of ESA's Boost! programme.

On 30 March 2022, Skyrora won the Best Innovation in Business award from the Midlothian & East Lothian Chamber of Commerce.

From the first days of the Russian invasion of Ukraine, Skyrora’s factory in Ukraine has remained fully functional, contributing to further progress of the company.

Skyrora aims to launch its first three-stage Skyrora XL rocket from SaxaVord spaceport, which is still under construction.

On May 26, 2022, Skyrora has completed a 70 kN hot-fire test for its 3D printed rocket engine, which will be used in the company’s XL launch vehicle.

On March 15, 2022 Skyrora announced the opening of a new rocket engine testing facility in Midlothian, Scotland, occupying an area of over 120,000 square feet. The site will host a team of up to 20 engineers once the testing site is running at full capacity.

In June 2022, Lee Rosen, SpaceX's former vice president of mission and launch operations, joined Skyrora as a new chief operating officer.

In July 2022, Skyrora opened a new manufacturing and production facility in Cumbernauld, Scotland. The site appears to be the largest of its kind in the UK.

In August 2022, Skyrora submitted its application to the UK Civil Aviation Authority (CAA) to receive the licence required for commercial spaceflight activities. The launch operator licence will allow Skyrora to undertake its planned orbital launches in 2023.

Education
The company has organised a graduate placement program to help the graduates and young talents to get into the sector. They offer technical positions for students and summer internships.

Skyrora has helped fund the retrieval of the first stages of Black Arrow R2 and R3 and provided sponsorship for the UKSEDS programme.

Ecological fuel
Skyrora has upgraded its kerosene made of unrecyclable waste plastic to be used as rocket fuel – Ecosene. The new fuel is said to produce 45 percent less greenhouse gas than traditional fuel. In February 2020, Skyrora has already used the fuel to fire its LEO engine for the final stage of Skyrora XL rocket at their engine test complex.

Skyrora started to use 3D printers to manufacture various rocketry components as a sustainable methodology of production.

External links

See also
 Skylark (British sounding rocket series)
 Space industry of Scotland

References

Aerospace companies of the United Kingdom
Private spaceflight companies
Microsatellite launch vehicles
Companies based in Edinburgh